Dorian Etheridge (born November 21, 1998) is an American football linebacker for the Atlanta Falcons of the National Football League (NFL). He played college football at Louisville.

Early life and high school
Dorian Etheridge was born on November 21, 1998 in Charleston, West Virginia. Etheridge attended Capital High School where he competed as an outside linebacker. While playing for Capital High, Etheridge received Two-Time All-State Selection Honors by the West Virginia Sports Writers Association.

College career
Etheridge was a three-star prospect and tabbed the No. 6 player in West Virginia according to Rivals.com and the No. 50-ranked outside linebacker by ESPN. He committed to Louisville over West Virginia, Virginia Tech, Pittsburgh, Maryland, Purdue and Marshall. 
Etheridge played 4 years at Louisville as a linebacker.  He appeared in 45 career games totaling 258 tackles, 24.5 tackles for loss, 4.5 sacks and one interception.

Professional career 
After going unselected in the 2021 NFL Draft, Etheridge signed as a free agent with the Atlanta Falcons on May 1, 2021. He made the Falcons roster out of training camp. He played in five games before being waived on November 2, 2021 and re-signed to the practice squad. He signed a reserve/future contract with the Falcons on January 10, 2022.

On August 30, 2022, Etheridge was waived/injured by the Falcons and placed on injured reserve. He was released on September 8. On October 18, 2022, Etheridge was signed to the Falcons' practice squad.  He signed a reserve/future contract on January 9, 2023.

References

1998 births
Living people
American football linebackers
Atlanta Falcons players
Louisville Cardinals football players
Players of American football from West Virginia
Sportspeople from Charleston, West Virginia